In mathematics, the Legendre chi function is a special function whose Taylor series is also a Dirichlet series, given by

As such, it resembles the Dirichlet series for the polylogarithm, and, indeed, is trivially expressible in terms of the polylogarithm as

The Legendre chi function appears as the discrete Fourier transform, with respect to the order ν, of the Hurwitz zeta function, and also of the Euler polynomials, with the explicit relationships given in those articles.

The Legendre chi function is a special case of the Lerch transcendent, and is given by

Identities

Integral relations

References
 
 
 

Special functions